The Bendigo Cup is a Bendigo Jockey Club Group 3 Thoroughbred horse race, held under handicap conditions over a distance of 2400 metres at the Bendigo Racecourse, Bendigo, Victoria, Australia on a Wednesday in late October or early November.  Prizemoney is $500,000. It is a local public holiday.

History

Distance
 1947–1971 –  miles (~2200 metres) 
 1972–1993 – 2200 metres
 1994–2008 – 2400 metres
 2009–2010 – 2200 metres
 2011 onwards – 2400 metres

Grade
1979–2014 – Listed race 
2015 onwards – Group 3

Winners since 1918

 2022 – High Emocean
 2021 – Wentwood
 2020 – Princess Jenni
 2019 – Top Of The Range
 2018 – Red Alto
 2017 – Qewy
 2016 – Francis Of Assisi
 2015 – The Offer
 2014 – Bring Something
 2013 – Sertorius
 2012 – Puissance De Lune
 2011 – Tanby
 2010 – Dream Pedlar
 2009 – Zupacool
 2008 – Banana Man
 2007 – Captious 
 2006 – Gallic
 2005 – True Courser 
 2004 – Gallic
 2003 – Western Waters 
 2002 – Forlorna 
 2001 – Saboteur 
 2000 – Yammer 
 1999 – Majestic Avenue 
 1998 – race not held
 1997 – Napier Street 
 1996 – Cockade 
 1995 – Double Take 
 1994 – Ice Doctor 
 1993 – Frontier Boy 
 1992 – Rasputins Revenge 
 1991 – Stick Around 
 1990 – Jolly Good Thought 
 1989 – Chigarow 
 1988 – Betoota 
 1987 – Flying Eskimo 
 1986 – Impertinent Charge 
 1985 – Gold Deck 
 1984 – Toyed 
 1983 – Al Dwain 
 1982 – Spring Moss 
 1981 – Magistrate 
 1980 – Summer Fleur 
 1979 – Rothschild 
 1978 – Puramaka 
 1977 – Massuk 
 1976 – Bouverie 
 1975 – Shiftmar 
 1974 – Tudor Peak 
 1973 – Sendock
 1972 – Haarle 
 1971 – Raad 
 1970 – Honda 
 1969 – Whats Brewing 
 1968 – Bobalex 
 1967 – Peace Mission 
 1966 – Celero 
 1965 – Snowstream Lass 
 1964 – Spotted 
 1963 – Algalon 
 1962 – Oswald
 1961 – Torrid
 1960 – Savage
 1959 – Royal Symbol
 1958 – Declaree
 1957 – Baroda Beam
 1956 – Harry Lime 
 1955 – Sunish 
 1954 – Just Caroline 
 1953 – Most Regal 
 1952 – Most Regal
 1951 – Matterhorn
 1950 – Prince O'Fairies
 1949 – Flemish
 1948 – Doctrine
 1947 – Manakau 
 1946 - Skyway
 1945 – not run due to WWII
 1944 – not run due to WWII
 1943 – not run due to WWII
 1942 – not run due to WWII
 1941 – not run due to WWII
 1940 – not run due to WWII
 1939 – Bell Buoy
 1938 – Maluno
 1937 – Evening Mist
 1936 – Counter Patrol
 1935 – Gay Star
 1934 – Nellie's Tip
 1933 – Metallurgy
 1932 – Roc
 1931 – Lampra
 1930 – Temptation
 1929 – Master Lunette
 1928 – Madam
 1927 – Epilogue
 1926 – Longworthy
 1925 – Valwyne
 1924 – King Pan
 1923 – Creeper
 1922 – Yacamunda
 1921 – Gringalet
 1920 – Romani
 1919 – Bullengarook
 1918 – Hoprig

See also
 List of Australian Group races
 Group races

References

Sport in Bendigo
Horse races in Australia
Open middle distance horse races
Public holidays in Australia
Spring (season) events in Australia
Bendigo